Community Baboon Sanctuary is a protected area in Belize. It was established in 1985 to help address the threats of agriculture, logging and hunting of the black howler monkey ('baboon') and to educate locals and visitors about the importance of biodiversity, sustainability, and to promote the economic development of the Bermudian Landing community.

History 
On 23 February 1985, the Community Baboon Sanctuary (CBS) was founded by Dr. Robert Horwich an American primatologist and Fallet Young, a landowner on the village of Bermudian Landing. Originally created with twelve other landowners, as of 2013 there were over 200 properties involved. In 1998, the Women's Conservation Group was formed with women from the 7 villages in the Belize River Valle, directed by Jessy Young from 1998. In 2017 the group was awarded a United Nations Equator Prize for their efforts in "improving local livelihoods while safeguarding vulnerable wildlife populations".

Location 
Community Baboon Sanctuary is located 31 miles northwest of Belize City on the Northern Highway. CBS includes 7 villages from the Belize River Valley: Big Falls/ St. Pauls Bank, Willows Bank, Double Head Cabbage, Bermudian Landing, Isabella Bank, Scotland Halfmoon and Flowers Bank village.

Goals 
Community Baboon Sanctuary not only protects the black howler monkey but, many other species of flora and fauna within the Belize River Valle region, with their main goals being to: conserve, educate, research and tourism. In 1992-1994, in a special project, several family groups of monkeys from CBS were reintroduced into the Cockscomb Basin of Belize to repopulate the area.

About howler monkeys 
Howler monkeys are found only in the rainforests of the Americas ranging through eastern Bolivia, southern Brazil and Paraguay, and northern Argentina. They are the largest monkey in Latin American rainforests growing as high as up to three feet tall when standing and weigh from eight to twenty-two pounds. They have big necks and lower jaws, where their super-sized vocal cords are housed. They live high in the trees and hang from branches by their tails who tend to move in troops of about 18 monkeys deep; spending most of their time sleeping and grooming each other. In order to mark their territory, the howlers make loud vocalizations. They are the loudest animal in the New World, with howls that can travel for three miles through dense forest.

See also 

 Primatologist
 Belize
 List of protected areas of Belize 
 Conservation in Belize

References

National parks of Belize
Belize District
Belize Rural North